Lea is a village and civil parish in the South East of Herefordshire, just south-east of Ross-on-Wye and adjoining Gloucestershire. Amenities include a school, church, village hall, shop, public house, garage and a twice weekly mobile Post Office, all of which lie on the A40 road which passes through the village.

The railway engineering company Alan Keef Ltd has its headquarters on the outskirts of the village.

Between 1855 and 1964, Lea was served by Mitcheldean Road railway station on the Hereford, Ross and Gloucester Railway.

References

External links
Lea Parish Council
Alan Keef Ltd

Villages in Herefordshire